Fabio Casadei Turroni (born November 11, 1964) is an Italian novelist, musicologist and journalist. Son of the painter Rino Casadei Turroni, he studied singing and got his bachelor's degree as a musicologist at the Department of Art and Music at Bologna State University. He then established himself as a lyrical tenor. Casadei Turroni's performing style was highly appreciated by some of the best musicians of the 20th century, but at the age of 38 he gave up performing because of his health troubles, and started writing novels. He currently lives between Bologna and Milan.

His debut novel, Moto Perpetuo (Perpetuum Mobile), was a best seller and won the first prize at the 2001 GLBT Art Competition.  His second novel Cosmicomiche Orgasmiche (a clear tribute to Italo Calvino's Cosmicomiche) was published one year after. The third novel Angelo d'Edimburgo was published in 2006. The preface of the novel was written by the writer Roberto Pazzi, and the postface was written by the composer Sylvano Bussotti.

In 2007 Casadei Turroni wrote the libretto for an opera, Ceneraccio (Cinderella), taken from old Norwegian tales. The music was written by Sylvano Bussotti. Casadei Turroni also translated poems by Christopher Isherwood into Italian for musical settings by Bussotti.

Casadei Turroni is also a political activist in support of the International Lesbian and Gay Association and other LGBT organizations.

Works
Fiction

Novels
Moto perpetuo, Zoe edition, Forlì, 2001
Cosmicomiche Orgasmiche, Zoe edition, Forlì, 2002
Angelo d'Edimburgo, LM edition, Bologna, 2005
(ef)fusioni, ilmiolibro.it edition, 2011

Short novels

Squilli, in Menomen2, Mondadori, Milan, 2002
Alan, in Menonmen5, Mondadori, Milan, 2006
L'ultimo, in Bolognaracconta, BSB edition, Bologna, 2008

Screenplay

Il tributo, 2007

Music and literature essays

Mozartiane II, Maggio Musicale Fiorentino, Florence, 2007
Silvano-Sylvano, Accademia di Santa Cecilia, Rome, 2007
Parole diverse, WLM edition, Bergamo, 2008
Uccidere Bussotti - Ceneraccio, ilmiolibro edizioni, 2011

References

External links

 it.wikipedia.org about Fabio Casadei Turroni
 Fabio Casadei Turroni as a translator: a biographical book about Italian translators on Flipkart
 Fabio Casadei Turroni as a novelist: a biographical book about Italian writers on Amazon

1964 births
Living people
21st-century Italian novelists
Italian poets
Italian male poets
Italian translators
Translators to Italian
Italian opera librettists
Italian male novelists
Italian male dramatists and playwrights
21st-century Italian male writers
21st-century translators